The Lommel differential equation, named after Eugen von Lommel, is an inhomogeneous form of  the Bessel differential equation:

 

where Jν(z) is a Bessel function of the first kind and Yν(z) a Bessel function of the second kind.

See also
 Anger function
 Lommel polynomial
 Struve function
 Weber function

References

External links
 Weisstein, Eric W. "Lommel Differential Equation." From MathWorld—A Wolfram Web Resource.
 Weisstein, Eric W. "Lommel Function." From MathWorld—A Wolfram Web Resource.

Special functions